Gideon Moshe Sa'ar (born 9 December 1966) is an Israeli politician who served as Minister of Justice between 2021 and 2022. Sa'ar was previously a member of the Knesset for the Likud between 2003 and 2014, Deputy Prime Minister for a brief spell in 2021, as well as holding the posts of Education Minister (2009–2013) and Minister of the Interior (2013–2014). In 2019 Sa'ar returned to the Knesset and unsuccessfully ran against longtime leader Benjamin Netanyahu for the leadership of the Likud; he left the Knesset the following year after establishing a new party called New Hope.

Biography
Gideon Moshe Serchensky (later Sa'ar) was born in Tel Aviv. His mother Bruriah is a Mizrahi-Bukharan Jew who is the 7th generation of her family in Israel. His father Shmuel is an Ashkenazi Jew who was born in Ukraine and moved to Argentina as a child before immigrating to Israel. He has two siblings, a brother and a sister. His father was a doctor. Sa'ar grew up primarily in Tel Aviv, but as a child, he lived for a number of years in Mitzpe Ramon, where his father worked as a pediatrician, and in kibbutz Sde Boker, where he was the kibbutz doctor. At the time, Sde Boker was the residence of Israel's founding Prime Minister, David Ben-Gurion. His father was frequently in contact with Ben-Gurion as the kibbutz doctor, and the young Gideon Sa'ar met Ben-Gurion numerous times when accompanying his father on visits to his home, during which Ben-Gurion gave him geography quizzes. After serving in the Israel Defense Forces as an intelligence NCO in the Golani Brigade, Sa'ar studied political science at Tel Aviv University and then went on to study law at the same institution.

In May 2013, Sa'ar married Israeli news anchor Geula Even, with whom he has two children, David and Shira. Geula was born to Lithuanian-Jewish immigrants from the Soviet Union. Sa'ar has another two children, Alona and Daniela, from his first wife Shelly, as well as one grandchild.

Political career
Sa'ar worked as an aide to the Attorney General between 1995 and 1997, and then as an aide to the State Attorney until 1998.
Sa'ar was appointed cabinet Secretary in 1999 and again from 2001–2 after Likud's Ariel Sharon won a special election for Prime Minister. In the 2003 elections he won a seat in the Knesset on Likud's list, and was appointed Likud Parliamentary Group Chairman as well as Chairman of the Coalition. He was opposed to Israel's unilateral disengagement plan, and attempted to pass a bill demanding a referendum on the subject.

After retaining his seat in the 2006 elections he was reappointed Group Chairman and also became a deputy Knesset speaker.

While in the Knesset, Sa'ar proposed bills to jail employers who fire pregnant women, (he chaired the Knesset Committee on the Status of Women) and to ban cosmetics testing on animals.

In December 2008 Sa'ar won the Likud primaries for its list going into the 2009 elections, giving him second place on the Likud list after leader Binyamin Netanyahu. He retained his seat, and was appointed Minister of Education on 31 March.

In 2012, he again gained the most votes in Likud primaries, and entered the 19th Knesset.

In September 2014, Sa'ar announced that he would be resigning his post before the next election; with rumors of an alleged sexual harassments background for his sudden quit. He said he would still remain a member of the Likud. On 17 September, he took a hiatus from politics. He left the Knesset on 5 November, and was replaced by Leon Litinetsky.

On 3 April 2017 Sa'ar announced his return to politics and intention to run in the next Likud primaries. He was seen as a potential candidate for party leadership and eventually prime minister.

In September 2017, The Jerusalem Post ranked him 5th on its "50 most influential Jews" list, calling him the "heir apparent to the Likud throne". In September 2018, he was ranked 25th along with fellow Likud members Yisrael Katz and Gilad Erdan.

In December 2020, Sa'ar announced that he would leave Likud and will form his own party, called New Hope. He submitted his Knesset resignation on 9 December, which went into effect on 11 December. The party contested the 2021 Israeli legislative election, with the intent of forming a governing coalition, and removing Netanyahu from office. He regained his seat in the Knesset, as New Hope gained six seats at the elections.

In June 2021, Sa'ar became Minister of Justice in the thirty-sixth government of Israel.

Likud leadership run

In October 2019, amid coalition talks, Prime Minister Netanyahu indicated he was considering holding a snap election for party leadership. In a terse tweet, Sa'ar responded "I'm ready." After Netanyahu decided against holding a leadership election, Sa'ar confirmed he would run in the next election and would support Netanyahu until then.

On 24 November 2019, Sa'ar asked the Likud Central Committee to schedule a party leadership race within two weeks, allowing the winner to try to form a coalition government before the Knesset would be dissolved which would trigger new Knesset elections, the third in a year. After the Knesset was dissolved and elections set for 2 March 2020, leadership elections were set for 26 December 2019. Sa'ar received the endorsement of a few Likud Members of Knesset, including Haim Katz, the powerful head of the Likud central committee. Netanyahu was endorsed by Minister of Public Security Gilad Erdan while Knesset speaker Yuli Edelstein declined to endorse either candidate.

During the campaign, Netanyahu's campaign slammed Sa'ar on Twitter saying he "has aligned with the Left and the media in order to remove the prime minister from the leadership of the state". At a conference the week before, Sa'ar had spoken against the "two state illusion" and criticized Netanyahu for offering territorial concessions to the Palestinians despite them being uninterested in peace talks, saying, "Around the world, the words 'two-state solution' remain a kind of certificate of acceptance. I have to tell you this is not a helpful position."

As widely expected, Netanyahu won handily with 72.5% to Sa'ar's 27.5%.

Views and opinions
Sa'ar has stated that he is opposed to a two-state solution, arguing "There is no two-state solution; there is at most a two-state slogan", and that it would be "a mistake to return to the idea of establishing a Palestinian state in Judea and Samaria as a solution to the conflict." He has expressed support for a long-term solution involving Jordan. He supported annexation of the West Bank, and supported the idea of Palestinian autonomy in a federation with Jordan.

As a teenager, Saar joined the ultra-nationalist Tehiya movement protesting the 1982 evacuation of Israeli settlements in the Sinai Peninsula as per the Egypt–Israel peace treaty.

References

Further reading 
 Goodbye, two-state solution, January 2017, The Jerusalem Post
 Oslo is obsolete: Time for a victory mindset, July 2018, The Jerusalem Post
 New Leadership for Israel? A Conversation with Gideon Saar, February 2021, The Washington Institute for Near East Policy

External links

Biography at New Hope website.

1966 births
Living people
20th-century Israeli lawyers
21st-century Israeli lawyers
Commanders of the Order of Merit of the Italian Republic
Deputy Speakers of the Knesset
Israeli Ashkenazi Jews
Israeli Mizrahi Jews
Israeli people of Argentine-Jewish descent
Israeli people of Mountain Jewish descent
Jewish Israeli politicians
Likud politicians
Members of the 16th Knesset (2003–2006)
Members of the 17th Knesset (2006–2009)
Members of the 18th Knesset (2009–2013)
Members of the 19th Knesset (2013–2015)
Members of the 21st Knesset (2019)
Members of the 22nd Knesset (2019–2020)
Members of the 23rd Knesset (2020–2021)
Members of the 24th Knesset (2021–2022)
Members of the 25th Knesset (2022–)
Ministers of Education of Israel
Ministers of Internal Affairs of Israel
Ministers of Justice of Israel
New Hope (Israel) politicians
Academic staff of Ono Academic College
Order of Civil Merit members
Politicians from Tel Aviv
Tel Aviv University alumni